Ruby O'Donnell (born 26 October 2000) is an English actress. Since 2013, O'Donnell has portrayed the role of Peri Lomax in the Channel 4 soap opera Hollyoaks. For her portrayal of Peri, she won the award for Best Young Actor at the 2016 British Soap Awards.

Early and personal life
O'Donnell was born in Warrington and grew up in Appleton. She has two brothers. She attended Grappenhall Heys Primary School and then Bridgewater High School. She took acting classes at Little Stars Stage School. Since 2019, O'Donnell has been in a relationship with professional rugby player Sam Halsall.

Career
In September 2013, it was announced that O'Donnell had been cast in Hollyoaks as Peri Lomax, the youngest child of the newly established Lomax family. Of the family's arrival, executive producer Bryan Kirkwood commented: "I was conscious of the fact that Ste was languishing on his own with no family around him. I'm eager to bring in a strong female force." On 23 November 2014, it was announced that O'Donnell's character would be involved in a teen pregnancy storyline alongside character Tom Cunningham (Ellis Hollins). The storyline was devised as an effort to promote safe sex. On the storyline, O'Donnell said "Some of the scenes have been hard to tackle because I am still quite young and I've had to do a lot of research for them. I am younger than Peri, as she is just turning 15 and I’m only 14 myself. So I’ve done the research to help with my performances and to find out how teenagers actually do react in these situations." She also said, "When I was first told about the story, I was nervous and didn’t know what to expect, but then I had a lot of meetings about it with the show’s executive producer Bryan Kirkwood, the storyliners and the other producers. They explained it to me and made me feel a lot more comfortable about it. Now I’ve got into it, I’m very excited about the storyline and I’m really enjoying doing it." For her role as Peri, O'Donnell has been nominated twice in the Inside Soap Awards in 2014  and 2015. In August 2017, O'Donnell was longlisted for Best Young Actor at the Inside Soap Awards however she did not progress to the shortlist. O'Donnell has also been nominated for Best-On Screen partnership with Ellis Hollins, and was also nominated for Best Young Performance in 2015 and Best Young Actress at The British Soap Awards in 2016. O'Donnell's character has since developed a relationship with Juliet Nightingale (Niamh Blackshaw), for which the pair received a nomination for Best Soap Partnership at the I Talk Telly Awards.

Awards and nominations

References

External links 
 

Living people
2000 births
Actresses from Warrington
English child actresses
English soap opera actresses
English people of Irish descent